Mud Corner Cemetery is a Commonwealth War Graves Commission burial ground for the dead of the First World War located near Ypres, on the Western Front.

The cemetery grounds were assigned to the United Kingdom in perpetuity by King Albert I of Belgium in recognition of the sacrifices made by the British Empire in the defence and liberation of Belgium during the war.

Foundation

The cemetery, near Ploegsteert ("Plug Street" to the common soldier of the time), is one of the smaller of the 23000 cemeteries maintained by the Commonwealth War Graves Commission, with just 85 graves. They date from the outbreak of the Battle of Messines.

References

External links

 
 

Commonwealth War Graves Commission cemeteries in Belgium